Dontae' Antijuaine Jones (born June 2, 1975) is an American former professional basketball player, formerly of the Boston Celtics of the National Basketball Association (NBA).

Jones played college basketball at Northeast Mississippi Community College where he is the Tigers' all-time leading scorer, rebounder, and shot blocker.  His #32 jersey has been retired by the school.  After playing two seasons for the Tigers he transferred to Mississippi State University to finish his college career.

He was named Most Valuable Player of the 1996 SEC men's basketball tournament after leading Mississippi State to their first SEC Tournament championship by virtue of a win over top-ranked University of Kentucky in the SEC tournament championship game. That same season he led Mississippi State to the NCAA Men's Basketball Final Four, picking up a Regional MVP honor along the way. Jones, along with his 1995–96 Bulldog teammates, was inducted into the Mississippi Sports Hall of Fame in 2016.

He was selected out of Mississippi State University as the 21st pick by the New York Knicks in the 1996 NBA Draft but was traded, along with Walter McCarty, John Thomas and Scott Brooks, to the Celtics in exchange for Chris Mills shortly before the 1997–98 NBA season began (he had previously taken part in no games in 1996–97 with the Knicks due to a foot injury).

After his NBA season, Jones played for the Memphis Houn'Dawgs in the American Basketball Association (ABA), and in Greece, Turkey, Italy, Korea and China.

An apostrophe was intentionally placed on the end of his first name by his mother for distinctiveness.

As of November 2012 he has been working as the program director at the Nashville Youth Basketball Association (NYBA), which is designed to help all middle Tennessee-area and Nashville city youth in metro Nashville improve their basketball skills. He is a highly regarded youth coach.

Notes

External links

Basketpedya.com Player Profile
Dontae' Jones at basketball-reference.com

1975 births
Living people
20th-century African-American sportspeople
21st-century African-American sportspeople
African-American basketball players
American expatriate basketball people in China
American expatriate basketball people in Greece
American expatriate basketball people in Italy
American expatriate basketball people in Mexico
American expatriate basketball people in South Korea
American expatriate basketball people in Turkey
American expatriate basketball people in Venezuela
American men's basketball players
Anyang KGC players
Apollon Patras B.C. players
ABA All-Star Game players
Basket Napoli players
Basketball players from Nashville, Tennessee
Beijing Ducks players
Boston Celtics players
CBA All-Star Game players
Halcones de Xalapa players
Korean Basketball League players
La Crosse Bobcats players
Mississippi State Bulldogs men's basketball players
New York Knicks draft picks
Northeast Mississippi Tigers basketball players
Small forwards